Riccardo Pittis (born 18 December 1968 in Milan, Italy) is a former Italian professional basketball player. During his basketball playing career, he was nicknamed Acciughino (English: Anchovy). He was among the 105 player nominees for the 50 Greatest EuroLeague Contributors list.

Professional career
During his pro club career, Pittis competed in the Italian League for two decades (1984–2004), playing in a total of 20 seasons. Pittis spent his whole club career playing with two teams: Olimpia Milano and Pallacanestro Treviso. With Olimpia, he won Europe's premiere basketball competition twice, as he won the EuroLeague championship with the club in 1987 and 1988. He also won the European-wide third level FIBA Korać Cup title in 1993 with Olimpia. With Benetton Treviso, he won the European-wide secondary level FIBA Saporta Cup title in 1995 and 1999. 

Pittis led the EuroLeague in steals a total of 4 times (1992, 1994, 1996, and 2003). He finished his club playing career with 6,637 points scored and 1,811 steals, in 708 games played in the Italian League. His total of 1,811 career steals is the Italian League's all-time record. Pittis finished his EuroLeague career with 1,481 points scored and 420 steals, in 168 games played in 9 seasons.

National team career
Pittis was a regular member of the senior Italian national team. With Italy's senior national team, he won two EuroBasket silver medals, at the 1991 EuroBasket and the 1997 EuroBasket. With Italy, he also played at the 1990 FIBA World Championship, the 1992 FIBA European Olympic Qualifying Tournament, the 1993 EuroBasket, and the 1995 EuroBasket. In total, he played in 118 games and scored 1,017 points, with Italy's senior national team.

Post-playing career
After he finished his professional club basketball playing career, Pittis began working as a TV sports commentator for Sky Sport in 2005. In 2010, he became the Manager of the senior Italian national basketball team. In 2012, he became the General manager of Universo Treviso Basket.

References

External links
FIBA Archive Profile
Euroleague.net Profile
FIBA Europe Profile
Italian League Profile 
Olimpia Milano Hall of Fame

1968 births
Living people
Basketball players from Milan
Basketball executives
Italian men's basketball players
1990 FIBA World Championship players
Olimpia Milano players
Pallacanestro Treviso players
Shooting guards
Small forwards
Mediterranean Games medalists in basketball
Mediterranean Games gold medalists for Italy
Competitors at the 1993 Mediterranean Games